Palanga — a resort town in western Lithuania, on the shore of the Baltic Sea.

Palanga is the busiest and the largest summer resort in Lithuania and has sandy beaches (18 km, 11 miles long and up to 300 metres, 1000 ft wide) and sand dunes.

Officially Palanga has the status of a city municipality and includes Šventoji, Nemirseta, Būtingė, Palanga International Airport and other settlements, which are considered as part of the city of Palanga.

Legend

According to legend, there was a pagan shrine at the foot of a hill in Palanga where a beautiful priestess named Birutė used to tend the ceremonial fires. Having heard of Birutė's beauty, Kęstutis, the Grand Duke of Lithuania, came to make her his wife. The Lithuanian Bychowiec Chronicle records that Birutė "did not consent, and answered that she had promised the gods to remain a virgin as long as she lived.

Kęstutis then resorted to take her by force, and with great pomp brought her back to his capital, Trakai, where he invited his kinsmen and celebrated with a lavish wedding..."  Kęstutis was later murdered and Birutė returned to Palanga and resumed serving at the shrine until her death. The legend claimed that she was buried in the hill which is now named after her.

History
Not far from Šventoji, archaeologists discovered an encampment which indicates that the area was inhabited some 5,000 years ago. Between the 10th and 13th centuries Palanga had been one of the main settlements of Mēguva Land, inhabited by the Curonians. Situated upon the trail of the ancient Amber Road, it became a centre of trade and crafts.

In historical documents the name of Palanga was first mentioned in 1161 when King Valdemar I of Denmark disembarked there with his army and captured the castle of the Curonians.

Between the 13th and 15th centuries, the inhabitants of Palanga had to confront the Teutonic Knights in the south and the Livonian Brothers of the Sword in the north. Their adversaries were unable to achieve their goal of capturing the Lithuanian sea-coast from Klaipėda to Šventoji. Grand Duke Vytautas the Great considered granting Palanga to the Teutonic Knights, however Supreme Duke Jogaila prevented it. Eventually in 1422 Palanga passed to the Grand Duchy of Lithuania under the Treaty of Melno. In 1427 Jogaila saw sea for the first time in Palanga.

The first small wooden Catholic church in Palanga was built in ~1540 at the behest of Grand Duchess Anna Jagiellon.

The harbour of Šventoji gradually developed into a trading centre. British merchants established enterprises in Šventoji in 1685. During the Great Northern War, in which the Polish–Lithuanian Commonwealth allied with Saxony, Denmark and Russia against Sweden, the Swedish Army ravaged Palanga, destroyed the harbour at Šventoji, and blocked up the entrance with rocks in 1701.

After the Third Partition of Poland and Lithuania in 1795 Lithuania became a part of the Russian Empire. In 1819 Palanga was transferred from the Vilna Governorate to Grobin County (Latvian: Grobiņa) of the Courland Governorate.

In 1824, the manor of Palanga was purchased  by Count Michał Tyszkiewicz (1761–1839). His grandson Józef Tyszkiewicz built a pier and engaged ships to transport passengers and bricks to nearby Liepāja. Palanga began to develop as a resort in the early 19th century. The pier has been a favourite spot for taking a stroll and other recreation since 1892. Józef Tyszkiewiczs's son, Feliks Tyszkiewicz, commissioned the construction of the neo-renaissance Tiškevičiai Palace, built by the famous German architect Franz Schwechten in 1897.

The French landscape architect Édouard André designed a large park around the palace, between 1897 and 1907. The palace became a favourite gathering place for concert performances. Amongst the good friends and associates of Feliks Tyszkiewicz was the notary, Jonas Kentra.

Following the Lithuanian press ban of 1864, Palanga became an important location for the smuggling of Lithuanian publications from the west. The Rev. Marcijonas Jurgaitis, physician Liudas Vaineikis, and notary Jonas Kentra, played significant roles in this activity. After Kentra obtained official permission, a public performance featuring the comedy, America in the Bathhouse (Amerika pirtyje), was performed in the Lithuanian language. This had previously not been permitted. However, later the Tsarist authorities deported Vaineikis and twenty-five other people to Siberia in 1901.

In 1919, after the breakup of the Russian Empire, Palanga temporarily became a part of Latvia, like the rest of the Courland Governorate. In 1921, after Lithuanian exchange of its Aknysta town, Brunava Parish and some other villages with Latvia, Palanga was peacefully transferred to Lithuania following a Lithuanian-Latvian treaty and giving Lithuania access to the sea. A popular among Lithuanians saying of the event at the time was “we exchanged our land with out land“.

Before World War II, nearly half the population of the town was Jewish. The production of decorative objects and jewellery made from amber found on the seashore, for which Palanga is famous, was formerly a Jewish industry. Many Jews also earned their livelihood by providing various services for summer vacationers. Between the world wars Jews were active in local government, serving on the city council as mayor or deputy mayor. The deteriorating economy resulting from antisemitism caused many to immigrate to South Africa, the United States, and Palestine. Soon after the outbreak of the German-Soviet war on June 22, 1941, Palanga was occupied by the Germans and all the Jews were concentrated at the bus station. The males aged 13 and above were taken outside the town and murdered in pits they were forced to dig. The women and children were held for a month in the synagogue, and then executed.

The Tiškevičiai Palace's park was converted into a botanical garden in 1960. Today it contains two hundred different types of trees and shrubs, including an oak tree planted by President Antanas Smetona. The palace, now the Palanga Amber Museum, has an extensive collection of amber jewellery and other artifacts. Symphonic concerts as well as other musical festivals and events take place in the summer, usually in the evening.

Location

Palanga is a resort town through which the Šventoji and Rąžė (Samogitian: Ronžē) rivers flow into the Baltic Sea. Rąžė was formerly known as Alanga and gave Palanga its name: Palanga, which literally means on the Alanga River. The Palanga municipality extends 24 kilometres from Nemirseta in the south to the Latvian border in the north. Palanga is subdivided into Nemirseta, Vanagupė, Kunigiškiai, Manciškiai, and Šventoji – five neighbouring fishing villages which were united into one city following administrative changes to the area. After the Klaipėda Region was ceded to Germany in March 1939, Nemirseta was the northernmost village of East Prussia; conversely Palanga was a border checkpoint between Russian-occupied Lithuania and Germany.

Transportation

The municipality is accessed by roads from Klaipėda and Šiauliai. There is no railway in the municipality (the closest rail connection is in Kretinga, the capital of the Kretinga district municipality). Palanga's International Airport, the third largest in Lithuania, offers connecting flights to Scandinavia, Germany, Ireland, United Kingdom, Poland and to the biggest city in Baltic States - Riga, Latvia. The airport is located between Palanga and Šventoji, and it handles more flights in the summer due to the resort nature of the municipality.

Places of interest

In the summer, many tourists come to visit and stay in Palanga, both for its beaches and to enjoy the maritime atmosphere. There is a carnival centred on Jonas Basanavičius Street, which is a pedestrian-only thoroughfare during the high season. There are dozens of restaurants, bars, rides, and other forms of entertainment. A new observation wheel opened in ~2021 scaling 40 meters. It is claimed its to be the tallest wheel in all of the baltic states. 

The aforementioned Palanga Amber Museum is open to the public, as are as the museum's extensive botanical gardens. Anaičiai Ethnographic Cemetery holds a collection of 19th- and early 20th-century graves. In the Sculpture Garden, one can find 28 contemporary statues by artists from Armenia, Estonia, Latvia, Lithuania and Ukraine.

Also found in Palanga is one of the oldest operating pharmacies in Lithuania. It was established in the mid-19th century.

The city is also home to a regional radio station, FM Palanga.

Notable people

 Birutė (died 1382) was the second wife of Kęstutis, Grand Duke of Lithuania, and mother of Vytautas the Great
 Julius Brutzkus (1870–1951) a Lithuanian Jewish historian, scholar, and politician.
 Boris Brutskus (1874–1938) a Russian economist, forced into exile by the Bolshevik government in 1922
 Vladas Jurgutis (1885 in Joskaudai near Palanga – 1966 in Vilnius) a Lithuanian priest, economist, and professor
 Liudvikas Narcizas Rasimavičius (born 1938) a Lithuanian politician. In 1990 he was among those who signed the Act of the Re-Establishment of the State of Lithuania
 Andrew Von Etter (1940–1967) a Boston mobster, emigrated with his parents to the United States in 1947.
 Edmundas Benetis (born 1953) a Lithuanian architect
 Raimundas Palaitis (born 1957) a Lithuanian politician, Minister of the Interior from 2008 to 2012
 Indrė Šerpytytė (born 1983) a Lithuanian artist in London, works with photography, sculpture, installation and painting.
 Renaldas Seibutis (born 1985) a Lithuanian professional basketball player
 Justė Juozapaitytė (born 1994) a Lithuanian model, beauty pageant contestant and entrepreneur.
 Karolis Laukzemis (born 1992) a Lithuanian professional footballer.

Twin towns – sister cities

Palanga is twinned with:

 Bergen auf Rügen, Germany
 Bucha, Ukraine
 Eilat, Israel
 Jūrmala, Latvia
 Kobuleti, Georgia
 Liepāja, Latvia
 Simrishamn, Sweden
 Ustka, Poland

The city was previously twinned with:
 Chernyakhovsk, Russia
 Primorye, Russia
 Svetlogorsk, Russia
 Svetlogorsky District, Russia

Significant depictions in popular culture
 Palanga is one of the starting towns of Lithuania in the turn-based strategy game Medieval II: Total War: Kingdoms.

See also
 Ošupis

References

External links

Palanga Tourist Centre (in Lithuanian)
Palanga Town Council
Accommodation in Palanga
Baltic Amber Road
Historic images of Palanga
Palanga for tourists

 
Cities in Klaipėda County
Cities in Lithuania
Seaside resorts in Lithuania
Municipalities administrative centres of Lithuania
Grobin County
Holocaust locations in Lithuania
Geographic history of Latvia
Territorial disputes of Lithuania